Trochonematoidea is an extinct taxonomic superfamily of fossil sea snails, marine gastropod molluscs.

Families
Families with the superfamily Trochonematoidea include:
 † Trochonematidae
 † Lophospiridae

References

Prehistoric gastropods